Barrett is a small unincorporated community and coal town with a population of 781 in Boone County in the U.S. state of West Virginia. Barrett lies along the Pond Fork River.  Barrett was named for Charles Barrett of Madison, who was an employee of the Cole & Crane Lumber Company, which had a mill there.

References 

Unincorporated communities in Boone County, West Virginia
Unincorporated communities in West Virginia
Charleston, West Virginia metropolitan area
Coal towns in West Virginia